The Battle of Bayou Bourbeux also known as the Battle of Grand Coteau, Battle of Boggy Creek or the Battle of Carrion Crow Bayou (Carencro is the Cajun French word for buzzard), which is present day Carencro Bayou, was fought in southwestern Louisiana west of the town of Grand Coteau, during the American Civil War.

The engagement was between the forces of Confederate Brigadier General Thomas Green and Union Brigadier General Stephen G. Burbridge.

Battle

Under orders from Major General Richard Taylor, Green launched the
attack on the Union camp after receiving three infantry regiments on November 2, 1863. These regiments were led by Colonel Oran M. Roberts.

Lieutenant William Marland of the 2nd Massachusetts Battery earned the Congressional Medal of Honor for his actions during this battle.

The Federals reported casualties of 26 killed, 124 wounded, and 566 captured or missing. The Confederates admitted a loss of 22 killed and 103 wounded.

Notes

References
 The War of the Rebellion: A Compilation of the Official Records of the Union and Confederate armies.  Series 1, Volume 26 (Part I).  United States War Department, 1889, Government Printing Office.  See Official Records of the American Civil War.
 
 Colonel Oran M. Roberts Report, Battle of Bayou Bourbeux, November 3, 1863, Louisiana History, edited by Alwyn Barr, VI, No 1 (Spring 1965), pp 83–91
 
 Yankee Autumn In Acadiana

External links
 Capture of the 67th Indiana Regiment Drawing, November 3, 1863, Boston College Libraries.
 Confederate Mass Grave Historical Marker
 Lithograph of "Battle of Grand Coteau, La., November 3rd, furious attack on the Sixtieth Indiana, Colonel Owen, Frank Leslie, Famous Leaders and Battle Scenes of the Civil War, University of South Florida.
 Personal narrative from State Journal correspondent November 9, 1863, Wisconsin Historical Society.

Bayou Bourbeux
Bayou Bourbeux
Bayou Bourbeux
Bayou Bourbeux
St. Landry Parish, Louisiana
November 1863 events
Grand Coteau, Louisiana